Since 2013 around 15,000 Muslims had been besieged in PK5 district in Bangui, Central African Republic.

Background 
Before March 2013 about 122,000 Muslims lived in Bangui. On 24 March 2013 Muslim Séléka coalition captured Bangui.

Timeline 
On 5 December 2013 Anti-balaka attacked Bangui. More than 50 bodies have been brought to a mosque in PK5 district. In December 2013 self-defense groups emerged in PK5 neighborhood as a response to Anti-balaka attacks.

On 26 June 2015 one of the leaders of PK5 self-defense groups, Haroun Gaye forced voter registration drive in PK5 to close. On 2 August 2015 MINUSCA tried to arrest him. His soldiers managed to repel attacks of international forces for seven hours using firearms, rocket launchers and grenades allowing him to escape. One peacekeeper was killed and eight were injured as a result. On 25 September after a Muslim driver was murdered, PK5 self-defense groups attacked in response Christian neighborhoods north of the enclave. Anti-balaka responded and started erecting barricades, preventing UN soldiers from accessing areas plagued by violence. On 15 October three people were killed and a dozen injured in clashes between Anti-balaka and self-defense groups after Anti-balaka fired at a group of Muslim boys playing soccer. At least 100 people were killed, 35,000 displaced and more than 1,075 buildings were destroyed between 26 September and 13 November as a result of clashes.

On 30 November 2015 Pope Francis visited PK5 district calling for end of hostilities. On 2 February 2016 it was reported that schools in PK5 will be reopened after two years. On 11 February self-defense groups from PK5 and Boeing signed non-aggression pact. 

On 19 June members of "50/50" self-defense force abducted six policemen demanding release of their fellow fighters who were arrested by security forces. On 20 June clashes erupted between MINUSCA and militiamen resulting in seven deaths (three civilians and four militiamen) and one peacekeeper being injured. On 12 August 35 ex-Seleka fighters including Abdoulaye Hissène and Haroun Gaye withdrew from PK5. On 4 October FACA commander, Mombéka Marcel, was assassinated by PK5 self-defense groups. On 30 October heavy clashes erupted between "Force" and "50/50" self-defense groups resulting in 10 deaths including Abdoul Danda and Issa Kappi.

On 7 February 2017 while security forces were trying to arrest militia leader Youssouf Malinga aka "Big Man" fire was exchanged between groups resulting in two civilians and two militiamen (including Youssouf himself) being killed. In response rebels murdered local pastor, Jean-Paul Sankagui.

On 17 January 2018 clashes erupted between "Force" self-defense group and group of armed traders "Tola" after merchants refused to pay taxes to militiamen. 47 shops were damaged as a result.

Failed disarmament operation 

In the night between 7 and 8 April 2018 MINUSCA and FACA launched "Operation Sukula" to disarm PK5 self-defense groups. Two militiamen were killed, 45 civilians and militiamen were injured and 12 peacekeepers were wounded. Local police station was burned down by members of militia following departure of security forces. On 10 April Rwandan peacekeepers engaged in gun battle with crowd of angry people some of which were armed who were protesting abduction of woman on the outskirts of PK5 district. 30 people were killed and 100 injured by Rwandan forces while one Rwandan peacekeeper was killed and eight injured. Security forces withdrew from the area as a result. On 11 January demonstration against MINUSCA was held during which bodies of 17 people killed during clashes were displayed. 

On 1 May PK5 self-defense forces led by Niméri Matar stormed Church of Fatima killing 27 people and wounding 170. On 6 May Anti-balaka with support of security forces attacked PK5 district, however their attack was repelled. On 20 May it was reported that taxis will resume operation in PK5. On 2 October six people were killed (including three civilians and three militiamen) and 10 injured as a result of shootout between "Force" and "Moussa Danda" groups. On 15 October pregnant woman was murdered by members of "Apo" group. On 24 October two militiamen from "50/50" were injured following shootout.

On 1 June 2019 Niméri Matar, leader of PK5 self-defense groups died of sickness. On 10 July heavy clashes erupted between members of militias resulting in four people being killed and 26 injured. On 29 November two militiamen were killed as a result of clashes between fighters loyal to "LT" and "Kamba-ti-Wa". FACA soldiers were deployed in surrounding neighborhoods to secure fleeing people.

Defeat of self-defense groups and aftermath 
On 26 December 2019 members of militia tried to force traders to pay tax for sale of Christmas toys. In response one of the militants was stabbed to death. Heavy clashes erupted between both groups with rebels burning stores of some merchants. At least 35 people died and 50 houses were burnt. On 31 December UN announced arms free zone in PK5 neighborhood forcing local fighters to lay down their weapons. On 4 January 2020 police returned to PK5 district for the first time in six years. On 15 January UN claimed to have dismantled all 13 bases of "ex-self-defense" forces. On 3 March it was announced that tax collection will be resumed in PK5. On 13 March SODECA announced that access to water will be restored in PK5.

On 22 October 2020 government launched disarmament campaign in PK5 district. More than 400 militiamen and 200 civilians returned tens of automatic rifles, 104 bullets and three shells. Around 30 ex-militiamen registered for DDR process.  On 30 October members of "Mujahideen" self-defense group looted local house stealing more than 150 million CFA Francs. On 2 March 2021 two people were killed and six wounded after military tried to arrest self-defense leader "Saddam". On 2 May he was arrested by security forces in Ramandji. On 29 July former PK5 militiaman "LT" was arrested after threatening police officers with a handgun.

Self-defense groups

References

External links 
 🇨🇫Central African Republic: Leader of Seleka fighters speaks up l Al Jazeera English

Central African Republic Civil War